Sooriyakumara Wannisinghe Punchi Banda Bulankulame, OBE, JP (known as P. B. Bulankulame or Tikiri Bandara Bulankulama Dissawa) (12 December 1890 - 17 December 1958) was a Ceylonese politician, who was the former Cabinet Minister of Lands and Land Development in Dudley Senanayake's   and John Kotelawala's  government.

Education and legal career 
Educated at the Royal College Colombo where he played in the Royal-Thomian. He then studied law at the Ceylon Law College becoming a Proctor. Having established his legal practice in his home town of Anuradhapura, he was later appointed a Justice of Peace.

Political career 
Bulankulame was elected to the 2nd State Council of Ceylon on 21 April 1944, following the death of the sitting member, H. R. Freeman. In 1947 he was elected in the 1947 general election from Anuradhapura to first Parliament of Ceylon.  In the first government since independence, he was appointed as Parliamentary Secretary to the Minister of Agriculture and Lands. He was re-elected in the 1952 general election and was appointed Cabinet Minister Lands and Land Development in the cabinet of Sir John Kotelawala, serving till 1956. He lost his seat in the 1956 general election to Sirimewan Godage.

Honors 
He was awarded the title of Dissawa of Anuradhapura by the British Governor of Ceylon. He was appointed Member of the Most Excellent Order of the British Empire (MBE) in the 1949 New Year Honours and later made an Officer of the Most Excellent Order of the British Empire in the 1951 Birthday Honours. The Bulankulama Disawa Mawatha in Anuradhapura is named after him.

See also
List of political families in Sri Lanka

References

Agriculture ministers of Sri Lanka
Parliamentary secretaries of Ceylon
Members of the 1st Parliament of Ceylon
Members of the 2nd Parliament of Ceylon
Members of the 2nd State Council of Ceylon
Ceylonese Officers of the Order of the British Empire
Sri Lankan justices of the peace
Dissava
Alumni of Royal College, Colombo
Alumni of Ceylon Law College
Sri Lankan Buddhists
Sinhalese politicians
Ceylonese proctors
1890 births
1958 deaths